This is a list of secondary schools in Brunei.

The schools may be a general secondary school, which leads to GCE 'O' Level and IGCSE qualifications, or in the Arabic religious stream, culminating in the sitting of Sijil Pelajaran Ugama Brunei (Brunei Religious Education Certificate) examination.

There are only eight schools which are single-sex: five of them are girls' schools and three are boys' schools.

Most of the schools are government schools. These schools have been established, owned and funded by the Brunei government. Also, students' admission into these schools does not incur tuition fees.

Whether it is government or private, almost all schools have standardised curriculum, which are set by the Ministry of Education for general schools, and the Department of Islamic Studies, Ministry of Religious Affairs for schools in the Arabic religious stream. Nevertheless, international schools are an exception.

External links
  Senarai Blog Sekolah-Sekolah Negara Brunei Darussalam
  Senarai Sekolah Arab
  SENARAI NAMA SEKOLAH-SEKOLAH SWASTA YANG TELAH DIPERBAHARUI PENDAFTARAN BAGI TAHUN AKADEMIK 2018 UPDATED 30/12/2017